San Felice Aversa Normanna (usually referred to as Aversa Normanna ) is an Italian association football club located in Aversa, Campania. Currently it plays in Serie D.

History
The club was founded in 1925.

In the 2007–08 Serie D season, the team won direct promotion to Lega Pro Seconda Divisione after finishing first in Girone H. They also won the Scudetto Dilettanti (the over-all Serie D championship) by winning the end-of-year tournament played amongst the nine division winners. Aversa Normanna were relegated in 2012–13, but readmitted to fill a vacancy. Something similar happened the following season: after being defeated by Tuttocuoio in the relegation playoffs, Aversa Normanna was successively allowed a spot in the 2014–15 Lega Pro season (the inaugural one as a unified third tier) to fill one of four vacancies in the league.

Colors and badge
The team's colour is all-dark red.

Honours

Serie D:
 Winners 1: 2007–08
Coppa Italia Serie D:
 Winners 1: 2006–07

References

External links
 Official homepage 

Football clubs in Campania
Aversa
Association football clubs established in 1925
Serie C clubs
1925 establishments in Italy